In Conversation with Alex Malley was an Australian television interview show on the Nine Network.

The program was funded by CPA Australia and featured its controversial then-CEO Alex Malley interviewing leaders from the world of politics, business and entertainment.

Cancellation

The TV show was abruptly cancelled in 2017 when Malley was fired as CPA Australia's CEO and stripped of his lifetime membership.

Malley's termination followed a dispute with CPA members over his $1.7m salary as well as the use of CPA funds to produce and promote In Conversation with Alex Malley and otherwise build Malley's personal profile.

A report published following Malley's departure revealed that CPA paid Channel Nine $4.16 million to broadcast the program as well as spending another $1.2 million to advertise the program on billboards.

All mentions of the TV show were removed from CPA's website within days of Malley's termination.

Season One

Season Two

Season Three

References

External links 
 
 

Australian television talk shows
Nine Network original programming
2016 Australian television series debuts